In algebra, polynomial long division is an algorithm for dividing a polynomial by another polynomial of the same or lower degree, a generalized version of the familiar arithmetic technique called long division. It can be done easily by hand, because it separates an otherwise complex division problem into smaller ones. Sometimes using a shorthand version called synthetic division is faster, with less writing and fewer calculations. Another abbreviated method is polynomial short division (Blomqvist's method).

Polynomial long division is an algorithm that implements the Euclidean division of polynomials, which starting from two polynomials A (the dividend) and B (the divisor) produces, if B is not zero, a quotient Q and a remainder R such that
A = BQ + R,
and either R = 0 or the degree of R is lower than the degree of B. These conditions uniquely define  Q and R, which means that Q and R do not depend on the method used to compute them.

The result R = 0 occurs if and only if the polynomial A has B as a factor. Thus long division is a means for testing whether one polynomial has another as a factor, and, if it does, for factoring it out. For example, if a root r of A is known, it can be factored out by dividing A by (x – r).

Example

Polynomial long division 
Find the quotient and the remainder of the division of   the dividend, by  the divisor.

The dividend is first rewritten like this:

The quotient and remainder can then be determined as follows:

Divide the first term of the dividend by the highest term of the divisor (meaning the one with the highest power of x, which in this case is x). Place the result above the bar (x3 ÷ x = x2).
Multiply the divisor by the result just obtained (the first term of the eventual quotient). Write the result under the first two terms of the dividend.
Subtract the product just obtained from the appropriate terms of the original dividend (being careful that subtracting something having a minus sign is equivalent to adding something having a plus sign), and write the result underneath. Then, "bring down" the next term from the dividend.
Repeat the previous three steps, except this time use the two terms that have just been written as the dividend.
Repeat step 4. This time, there is nothing to "bring down".

The polynomial above the bar is the quotient q(x), and the number left over (5) is the remainder r(x).

The long division algorithm for arithmetic is very similar to the above algorithm, in which the variable x is replaced (in base 10) by the specific number 10.

Polynomial short division
Blomqvist's method is an abbreviated version of the long division above. This pen-and-paper method uses the same algorithm as polynomial long division, but mental calculation is used to determine remainders. This requires less writing, and can therefore be a faster method once mastered.

The division is at first written in a similar way as long multiplication with the dividend at the top, and the divisor below it. The quotient is to be written below the bar from left to right.

Divide the first term of the dividend by the highest term of the divisor (x3 ÷ x = x2). Place the result below the bar. x3 has been divided leaving no remainder, and can therefore be marked as used with a backslash. The result x2 is then multiplied by the second term in the divisor −3 = −3x2. Determine the partial remainder by subtracting −2x2 − (−3x2) = x2. Mark −2x2 as used and place the new remainder x2 above it.

Divide the highest term of the remainder by the highest term of the divisor (x2 ÷ x = x). Place the result (+x) below the bar. x2 has been divided leaving no remainder, and can therefore be marked as used. The result x is then multiplied by the second term in the divisor −3 = −3x. Determine the partial remainder by subtracting 0x − (−3x) = 3x. Mark 0x as used and place the new remainder 3x above it.

Divide the highest term of the remainder by the highest term of the divisor (3x ÷ x = 3). Place the result (+3) below the bar. 3x has been divided leaving no remainder, and can therefore be marked as used. The result 3 is then multiplied by the second term in the divisor −3 = −9. Determine the partial remainder by subtracting −4 − (−9) = 5. Mark −4 as used and place the new remainder 5 above it.

The polynomial below the bar is the quotient q(x), and the number left over (5) is the remainder r(x).

Pseudocode

The algorithm can be represented in pseudocode as follows, where +, −, and × represent polynomial arithmetic, and / represents simple division of two terms:

 function n / d is
     require d ≠ 0
     q ← 0
     r ← n             // At each step n = d × q + r
 
     while r ≠ 0 and degree(r) ≥ degree(d) do
         t ← lead(r) / lead(d)       // Divide the leading terms
         q ← q + t
         r ← r − t × d
 
     return (q, r)

This works equally well when degree(n) < degree(d); in that case the result is just the trivial (0, n).

Euclidean division 

For every pair of polynomials (A, B) such that B ≠ 0, polynomial division provides a quotient Q and a remainder R such that 

and either R=0 or degree(R) < degree(B). Moreover (Q, R) is the unique pair of polynomials having this property.

The process of getting the uniquely defined polynomials Q and R from A and B is called Euclidean division (sometimes division transformation). Polynomial long division is thus an algorithm for Euclidean division.

Applications

Factoring polynomials

Sometimes one or more roots of a polynomial are known, perhaps having been found using the rational root theorem. If one root r of a polynomial P(x) of degree n is known then polynomial long division can be used to factor P(x) into the form  where Q(x) is a polynomial of degree n − 1.  Q(x) is simply the quotient obtained from the division process; since r is known to be a root of P(x), it is known that the remainder must be zero.

Likewise, if more than one root is known, a linear factor  in one of them (r) can be divided out to obtain Q(x), and then a linear term in another root, s, can be divided out of Q(x), etc. Alternatively, they can all be divided out at once: for example the linear factors  and  can be multiplied together to obtain the quadratic factor  which can then be divided into the original polynomial P(x) to obtain a quotient of degree 

In this way, sometimes all the roots of a polynomial of degree greater than four can be obtained, even though that is not always possible.  For example, if the rational root theorem can be used to obtain a single (rational) root of a quintic polynomial, it can be factored out to obtain a quartic (fourth degree) quotient; the explicit formula for the roots of a quartic polynomial can then be used to find the other four roots of the quintic.

Finding tangents to polynomial functions

Example
Find the equation of the line that is tangent to the following curve at :
 
Begin by dividing the polynomial by :
 

Cyclic redundancy check

A cyclic redundancy check uses the remainder of polynomial division to detect errors in transmitted messages.

See also
Polynomial remainder theorem
Synthetic division, a more concise method of performing Euclidean polynomial division
Ruffini's rule
Euclidean domain
Gröbner basis
Greatest common divisor of two polynomials

References

Polynomials
Computer algebra
Division (mathematics)